Bucculatrix amiculella is a moth in the family Bucculatricidae, and is known to be found in Colombia. It was first described by Philipp Christoph Zeller in 1897.

The larvae have been recorded feeding on Quercus species.

References 

Natural History Museum Lepidoptera generic names catalog

Bucculatricidae
Moths described in 1897
Taxa named by Philipp Christoph Zeller
Moths of South America